Padiès is a commune in the Tarn department in southern France.

The Château de Padiès is situated in the commune of Lempaut, 62 km to the southwest of Padiès.

Population

Geography
The Cérou forms most of the commune's northwestern border.

See also
Communes of the Tarn department

References

External links

 Lieux secrets du Pays Cathare on PADIES (Blog)

Communes of Tarn (department)